U.S. Route 460 (US 460) is a part of the U.S. Highway System that travels from Frankfort, Kentucky, to Norfolk, Virginia. In the U.S. state of Kentucky, US 460 extends from Frankfort, Kentucky and ends at the Virginia state line.

Route description

US 460 now begins when it splits from US 60 a few miles east of downtown Frankfort. It is a winding two-lane highway with no shoulders and intersects US 62 and I-75 at Georgetown. It proceeds to Paris, where it serves as the town's "Main Street" and intersects US 27 and US 68. 

The next major intersection is with I-64 in Mount Sterling. It proceeds through Frenchburg and West Liberty. In Salyersville, the Mountain Parkway ends by merging onto it. It is a 3-lane highway for 14 miles and then it merges with US 23 in Paintsville. US 460 East follows US-23 South through Prestonsburg and Pikeville. The route enters the southwestern part of Virginia.

Major intersections

References

4 in Kentucky
Transportation in Franklin County, Kentucky
Transportation in Scott County, Kentucky
Transportation in Bourbon County, Kentucky
Transportation in Montgomery County, Kentucky
Transportation in Menifee County, Kentucky
Transportation in Morgan County, Kentucky
Transportation in Magoffin County, Kentucky
Transportation in Johnson County, Kentucky
Transportation in Floyd County, Kentucky
Transportation in Pike County, Kentucky